Jang Gwang (born January 5, 1952) is a South Korean actor in film and television.

Filmography

Film

 Taste of Horror – Gym for Residents  (TBA) 
 Air Murder (2022)  
 Sinkhole (2021)
 White Day: Broken Barrier (2021) 
 60 Days of Summer (2018)
 Stand by Me (2018)The Villagers (2018)The Negotiation (2018)The Great Battle (2018)Along With the Gods: The Two Worlds (2017)Roman Holiday (2017)Ordinary Person (2017)Turning Mecard W: The Revival of Black Mirror (2017)Will You Be There? (2016)Bad Guys Always Die (2015)Collective Invention (2015)Untouchable Lawman (2015)Minority Opinion (2015) The Treacherous (2015)Emperor's Holidays (2015)Chronicle of a Blood Merchant (2015)Whistle Blower (2014) (cameo)The Road to Life (2014)Tabloid Truth (2014) (cameo)Miss Granny (2014) (cameo)The Plan Man (2014)Way Back Home (2013) (cameo)Marriage Blue (2013) (cameo)Iron Man 3 (2013) (Korean dubbing)Are You Ready? (2013) (documentary narrator)Secretly, Greatly (2013)New World (2013) The Snow Queen (2013)26 Years (2012) Tone-deaf Clinic aka Love Clinique (2012)Confession of Murder (2012)Masquerade (2012) The Outback (2012) (Korean dubbing)Silenced (2011)Up (2009) (Korean dubbing)Whistling Princess (2002)

 Television Little Women (2022)Moonshine (2021–2022)  
  Melancholia (2021)When My Love Blooms (2020)The Crowned Clown (2019)About Time (2018)Children of a Lesser God (2018)Queen of Mystery 2 (2018) Cross (2018)A Korean Odyssey (2017)Bad Thief, Good Thief (2017)Queen of Mystery (2017)Innocent Defendant (2017)Love in the Moonlight (2016)Memory (2016)Moorim School: Saga of the Brave (2016)Yong-pal (2015)Super Daddy Yeol (2015)Pinocchio (2014) (cameo, episode 2)You Are My Destiny (2014)Flower Grandpa Investigation Unit (2014)Gap-dong (2014)Goddess of Fire (2013)All About My Romance (2013)Bridal Mask (2012)Salamander Guru and The Shadows (2012)Ojakgyo Brothers (KBS1 / 2011)Vampire Prosecutor (2011) The Era of the Three Kims (1998)Fourth Republic (1995)Korea Gate (1995)

 Web series 
  Stock Struck (2022) - Kim Jin-bae
 Connect (2022) - doctor

 Television show
 Daughter Thieves'' (2022, Cast Member)

References

External links 

1952 births
Living people
South Korean male film actors
South Korean male television actors
South Korean male voice actors
21st-century South Korean male actors